The men's handball competition, one of two events of handball at the 2004 Summer Olympics, in Athens, took place at the Sports Pavilion (Faliro Coastal Zone Olympic Complex) during the preliminary round and quarter-finals (August 14–August 24), and at the Helliniko Olympic Indoor Arena  during the semi-finals and medal matches (August 27–August 29). A total of 180 players, distributed among twelve national teams, participated in this tournament.

Medalists

Qualification

Preliminary round
For the preliminary round, contested between August 14 and August 22, the twelve teams were distributed into two groups of six teams. Each team played against each of its five group opponents for a total of five matches. The four best-scoring teams advanced to the quarter-finals.

All times are local (UTC+3).

Group A

Group B

Knockout stage
In this single-elimination stage, the first- and second-placed teams of one group played against the other group's fourth- and third-placed teams, respectively, to contest the quarter-final round, held on August 24, at the Sports Pavilion. The winners advanced to the semi-finals, disputed at the Indoor Arena on August 27, with the losing semi-finalists playing for the bronze medal match on the following day, and the final being played two days later.

Bracket

Quarterfinals

5–8th place semifinals

Semifinals

Eleventh place game

Ninth place game

Seventh place game

Fifth place game

Bronze medal game

Gold medal game

Ranking and statistics

Final ranking

All Star Team

Source: IHF

Top goalscorers

Top goalkeepers

References

External links
Results book
2004 Summer Olympics official report Volume 2.

Men's handball
O
Men's events at the 2004 Summer Olympics